Governor Dixon may refer to:

Frank M. Dixon (1892–1965), 40th Governor of Alabama
Joseph M. Dixon (1867–1934), 7th Governor of Montana